The catastrophe of Sange was the explosion of a tank truck on 2 July 2010 in South Kivu, in the Democratic Republic of the Congo. The truck overturned in the village of Sange and later exploded, resulting in at least 230 deaths and 196 injured.

Crash
The tanker overturned in the village of Sange, near the Congo-Burundi border.  Mende Omalanga, the Democratic Republic of Congo's Minister of Communications, claimed that the tanker was trying to overtake a bus. A local police officer reported that the driver was traveling at an "excessive speed".

Explosion
An explosion occurred as villagers attempted to collect the fuel that was spilling from the overturned vehicle. "There was a crush (of people) and a petrol leak". The minister of communications, Lambert Omalanga, said that one local resident was smoking a cigarette, a spark from which ignited the fuel. Many mud and grass huts were destroyed in the subsequent fire.

Among the dead were 36 women and 61 children. Some of the injured had severe burn wounds. A medical source said that the local hospitals "do not have necessary logistical materials to treat those who are seriously injured".

It was initially reported that five of the dead were United Nations peacekeepers, but this was reported later as being incorrect.

See also 
 2006 Abule Egba pipeline explosion
 2006 Atlas Creek pipeline explosion
 2017 Bahawalpur explosion, very similar incident

References

Explosions in 2010
South Kivu road tanker explosion, 2010
2010 South Kivu fuel tank explosion
South Kivu road tanker explosion, 2010
Deaths caused by petroleum looting
July 2010 events in Africa
South
Tanker explosions